Neuville-Bourjonval is a commune in the Pas-de-Calais department in the Hauts-de-France region of France.

Geography
The A2 autoroute passes through the commune.

Population

Places of interest
 The church of St.Pierre, rebuilt, as was all of the village, after World War I.
 The Commonwealth War Graves Commission cemetery.

See also
Communes of the Pas-de-Calais department

References

External links

 The CWGC cemetery of Neuville-Bourjonval

Neuvillebourjonval